Attila Molnár (born 1897, date of death unknown) was a Romanian footballer. He competed in the men's tournament at the 1924 Summer Olympics.

References

External links

1897 births
Year of death missing
Romanian footballers
Romania international footballers
Liga I players
Olympic footballers of Romania
Footballers at the 1924 Summer Olympics
Sportspeople from Cluj-Napoca
Association football defenders